Saskatchewan is a province in Western Canada, bordered on the west by Alberta, on the north by the Northwest Territories, on the east by Manitoba, to the northeast by Nunavut, and on the south by the U.S. states of Montana and North Dakota. Saskatchewan and Alberta are the only landlocked provinces of Canada. In 2022, Saskatchewan's population was estimated at 1,205,119.

Residents primarily live in the southern prairie half of the province, while the northern half is mostly forested and sparsely populated. Roughly half live in the province's largest city Saskatoon or the provincial capital Regina. Other notable cities include Prince Albert, Moose Jaw, Yorkton, Swift Current, North Battleford, Estevan, Weyburn, Melfort, and the border city Lloydminster. English is the primary language of the province, with 82.4% of Saskatchewanians speaking English as their first language.

Saskatchewan has been inhabited for thousands of years by indigenous groups. Europeans first explored the area in 1690 and first settled in the area in 1774. It became a province in 1905, carved out from the vast North-West Territories, which had until then included most of the Canadian Prairies. In the early 20th century, the province became known as a stronghold for Canadian social democracy; North America's first social-democratic government was elected in 1944. The province's economy is based on agriculture, mining, and energy.

Saskatchewan is presently governed by premier Scott Moe, a member of the Saskatchewan Party which has been in power since 2007.

In 1992, the federal and provincial governments signed a historic land claim agreement with First Nations in Saskatchewan. The First Nations received compensation which they could use to buy land on the open market for the bands. Some First Nations have used their settlement to invest in urban areas, including Regina and Saskatoon.

Etymology 
The name of the province is derived from the Saskatchewan River. Henday's spelling was Keiskatchewan, with the modern rendering, Saskatchewan, being officially adopted in 1882 when a portion of the present-day province was designated a provisional district of the North-West Territories.

Geography 

Saskatchewan is the only province without a natural border. As its borders largely follow the geographic coordinates of longitude and latitude, the province is roughly a quadrilateral, or a shape with four sides. However, the southern border on the 49th parallel and the northern border on the 60th parallel appear curved on globes and many maps. Additionally, the eastern boundary of the province is partially crooked rather than following a line of longitude, as correction lines were devised by surveyors prior to the Dominion Lands Act homestead program (1880–1928).

Saskatchewan is part of the western provinces and is bounded on the west by Alberta, on the north by the Northwest Territories, on the north-east by Nunavut, on the east by Manitoba, and on the south by the U.S. states of Montana and North Dakota. Saskatchewan has the distinction of being the only Canadian province for which no borders correspond to physical geographic features (i.e. they are all parallels and meridians). Along with Alberta, Saskatchewan is one of only two land-locked provinces.

The overwhelming majority of Saskatchewan's population is located in the southern third of the province, south of the 53rd parallel.

Saskatchewan contains two major natural regions: the Boreal Forest in the north and the Prairies in the south. They are separated by an aspen parkland transition zone near the North Saskatchewan River on the western side of the province, and near to south of the Saskatchewan River on the eastern side. Northern Saskatchewan is mostly covered by forest except for the Lake Athabasca Sand Dunes, the largest active sand dunes in the world north of 58°, and adjacent to the southern shore of Lake Athabasca. The Cypress Hills, located in the southwestern corner of Saskatchewan and Killdeer Badlands (Grasslands National Park), are areas of the province that were unglaciated during the last glaciation period, the Wisconsin glaciation.

The province has 14 major drainage basins made up of various rivers and watersheds draining into the Arctic Ocean, Hudson Bay and the Gulf of Mexico.

Climate 

Saskatchewan receives more hours of sunshine than any other Canadian province. The province lies far from any significant body of water. This fact, combined with its northerly latitude, gives it a warm summer, corresponding to its humid continental climate (Köppen type Dfb) in the central and most of the eastern parts of the province, as well as the Cypress Hills; drying off to a semi-arid steppe climate (Köppen type BSk) in the southwestern part of the province. Drought can affect agricultural areas during long periods with little or no precipitation at all. The northern parts of Saskatchewan – from about La Ronge northward – have a subarctic climate (Köppen Dfc) with a shorter summer season. Summers can get very hot, sometimes above  during the day, and with humidity decreasing from northeast to southwest. Warm southern winds blow from the plains and intermontane regions of the Western United States during much of July and August, very cool or hot but changeable air masses often occur during spring and in September. Winters are usually bitterly cold, with frequent Arctic air descending from the north. with high temperatures not breaking  for weeks at a time. Warm chinook winds often blow from the west, bringing periods of mild weather. Annual precipitation averages 30 to 45 centimetres (12 to 18 inches) across the province, with the bulk of rain falling in June, July, and August.

Saskatchewan is one of the most tornado-active parts of Canada, averaging roughly 12 to 18 tornadoes per year, some violent. In 2012, 33 tornadoes were reported in the province. The Regina Cyclone took place in June 1912 when 28 people died in an F4 Fujita scale tornado. Severe and non-severe thunderstorm events occur in Saskatchewan, usually from early spring to late summer. Hail, strong winds and isolated tornadoes are a common occurrence.

Climate change 

The effects of climate change in Saskatchewan are now being observed in parts of the province. There is evidence of reduction of biomass in Saskatchewan's boreal forests (as with those of other Canadian prairie provinces) is linked by researchers to drought-related water stress, stemming from global warming, most likely caused by greenhouse gas emissions. While studies, as early as 1988 (Williams, et al., 1988) have shown climate change will affect agriculture, whether the effects can be mitigated through adaptations of cultivars, or crops, is less clear. Resiliency of ecosystems may decline with large changes in temperature. The provincial government has responded to the threat of climate change by introducing a plan to reduce carbon emissions, "The Saskatchewan Energy and Climate Change Plan", in June 2007.

History 

Saskatchewan has been populated by various indigenous peoples of North America, including members of the Sarcee, Niitsitapi, Atsina, Cree, Saulteaux, Assiniboine (Nakoda), Lakota and Sioux. The first known European to enter Saskatchewan was Henry Kelsey from England in 1690, who travelled up the Saskatchewan River in hopes of trading fur with the region's indigenous peoples. Fort La Jonquière and Fort de la Corne were first established in 1751 and 1753 by early French explorers and traders. The first permanent European settlement was a Hudson's Bay Company post at Cumberland House, founded in 1774 by Samuel Hearne. The southern part of the province was part of Spanish Louisiana from 1762 until 1802.

19th century 
In 1803, the Louisiana Purchase transferred from France to the United States part of what is now Alberta and Saskatchewan. In 1818, the U.S. ceded the area to Britain. Most of what is now Saskatchewan was part of Rupert's Land and controlled by the Hudson's Bay Company, which claimed rights to all watersheds flowing into Hudson Bay, including the Saskatchewan River, Churchill, Assiniboine, Souris, and Qu'Appelle River systems.

In the late 1850s and early 1860s, scientific expeditions led by John Palliser and Henry Youle Hind explored the prairie region of the province.

In 1870, Canada acquired the Hudson's Bay Company's territories and formed the North-West Territories to administer the vast territory between British Columbia and Manitoba. The Crown also entered into a series of numbered treaties with the indigenous peoples of the area, which serve as the basis of the relationship between First Nations, as they are called today, and the Crown. Since the late twentieth century, land losses and inequities as a result of those treaties have been subject to negotiation for settlement between the First Nations in Saskatchewan and the federal government, in collaboration with provincial governments.

In 1876, following their defeat of United States Army forces at the Battle of the Little Bighorn in Montana Territory in the United States, the Lakota Chief Sitting Bull led several thousand of his people to Wood Mountain. Survivors and descendants founded Wood Mountain Reserve in 1914.

The North-West Mounted Police set up several posts and forts across Saskatchewan, including Fort Walsh in the Cypress Hills, and Wood Mountain Post in south-central Saskatchewan near the United States border.

Many Métis people, who had not been signatories to a treaty, had moved to the Southbranch Settlement and Prince Albert district north of present-day Saskatoon following the Red River Rebellion in Manitoba in 1870. In the early 1880s, the Canadian government refused to hear the Métis' grievances, which stemmed from land-use issues. Finally, in 1885, the Métis, led by Louis Riel, staged the North-West Rebellion and declared a provisional government. They were defeated by a Canadian militia brought to the Canadian prairies by the new Canadian Pacific Railway. Riel, who surrendered and was convicted of treason in a packed Regina courtroom, was hanged on November 16, 1885. Since then, the government has recognized the Métis as an aboriginal people with status rights and provided them with various benefits.

European settlements 
The national policy set by the federal government, the Canadian Pacific Railway, the Hudson's Bay Company and associated land companies encouraged immigration. The Dominion Lands Act of 1872 permitted settlers to acquire one-quarter of a square mile of land to homestead and offered an additional quarter upon establishing a homestead. In 1874, the North-West Mounted Police began providing police services. In 1876, the North-West Territories Act provided for appointment, by the Ottawa, of a Lieutenant Governor and a Council to assist him.

Highly optimistic advertising campaigns promoted the benefits of prairie living. Potential immigrants read leaflets that described Canada as a favourable place to live and downplayed the need for agricultural expertise. Ads in The Nor'-West Farmer by the Commissioner of Immigration implied that western land was blessed with water, wood, gold, silver, iron, copper, and cheap coal for fuel, all of which were readily at hand. The reality was far harsher, especially for the first arrivals who lived in sod houses. However eastern money poured in and by 1913, long term mortgage loans to Saskatchewan farmers had reached $65 million.

The dominant groups comprised British settlers from eastern Canada and Britain, who comprised about half of the population during the late 19th and early 20th centuries. They played the leading role in establishing the basic institutions of plains society, economy and government.

20th century 
Gender roles were sharply defined. Men were primarily responsible for breaking the land; planting and harvesting; building the house; buying, operating and repairing machinery; and handling finances. At first, there were many single men on the prairie, or husbands whose wives were still back east, but they had a hard time. They realized the need for a wife. In 1901, there were 19,200 families, but this surged to 150,300 families only 15 years later. Wives played a central role in settlement of the prairie region. Their labour, skills, and ability to adapt to the harsh environment proved decisive in meeting the challenges. They prepared bannock, beans and bacon, mended clothes, raised children, cleaned, tended the garden, helped at harvest time and nursed everyone back to health. While prevailing patriarchal attitudes, legislation, and economic principles obscured women's contributions, the flexibility exhibited by farm women in performing productive and nonproductive labour was critical to the survival of family farms, and thus to the success of the wheat economy.

On September 1, 1905, Saskatchewan became a province, with inauguration day held on September 4. Its political leaders at the time proclaimed its destiny was to become Canada's most powerful province. Saskatchewan embarked on an ambitious province-building program based on its Anglo-Canadian culture and wheat production for the export market. Population quintupled from 91,000 in 1901 to 492,000 in 1911, thanks to heavy immigration of farmers from Ukraine, U.S., Germany and Scandinavia. Efforts were made to assimilate the newcomers to British Canadian culture and values.

In the 1905 provincial elections, Liberals won 16 of 25 seats in Saskatchewan. The Saskatchewan government bought out Bell Telephone Company in 1909, with the government owning the long-distance lines and left local service to small companies organized at the municipal level. Premier Walter Scott preferred government assistance to outright ownership because he thought enterprises worked better if citizens had a stake in running them; he set up the Saskatchewan Cooperative Elevator Company in 1911. Despite pressure from farm groups for direct government involvement in the grain handling business, the Scott government opted to loan money to a farmer-owned elevator company. Saskatchewan in 1909 provided bond guarantees to railway companies for the construction of branch lines, alleviating the concerns of farmers who had trouble getting their wheat to market by wagon. The Saskatchewan Grain Growers Association, was the dominant political force in the province until the 1920s; it had close ties with the governing Liberal party. In 1913, the Saskatchewan Stock Growers Association was established with three goals: to watch over legislation; to forward the interests of the stock growers in every honourable and legitimate way; and to suggest to parliament legislation to meet changing conditions and requirements.

Immigration peaked in 1910, and in spite of the initial difficulties of frontier life – distance from towns, sod homes, and backbreaking labour – new settlers established a European-Canadian style of prosperous agrarian society. The long-term prosperity of the province depended on the world price of grain, which headed steadily upward from the 1880s to 1920, then plunged down. Wheat output was increased by new strains, such as the "Marquis wheat" strain which matured 8 days sooner and yielded 7 more bushels per acre (0.72 m3/ha) than the previous standard, "Red Fife".

Urban reform movements in Regina were based on support from business and professional groups. City planning, reform of local government, and municipal ownership of utilities were more widely supported by these two groups, often through such organizations as the Board of Trade. Church-related and other altruistic organizations generally supported social welfare and housing reforms; these groups were generally less successful in getting their own reforms enacted.

The province responded to the First World War in 1914 with patriotic enthusiasm and enjoyed the resultant economic boom for farms and cities alike. Emotional and intellectual support for the war emerged from the politics of Canadian national identity, the rural myth, and social gospel progressivism The Church of England was especially supportive. However, there was strong hostility toward German-Canadian farmers. Recent Ukrainian immigrants were enemy aliens because of their citizenship in the Austro-Hungarian Empire. A small fraction were taken to internment camps. Most of the internees were unskilled unemployed labourers who were imprisoned "because they were destitute, not because they were disloyal".

The price of wheat tripled and acreage seeded doubled. The wartime spirit of sacrifice intensified social reform movements that had predated the war and now came to fruition. Saskatchewan gave women the right to vote in 1916 and at the end of 1916 passed a referendum to prohibit the sale of alcohol.

In the late 1920s, the Ku Klux Klan, imported from the United States and Ontario, gained brief popularity in nativist circles in Saskatchewan and Alberta. The Klan, briefly allied with the provincial Conservative party because of their mutual dislike for Premier James G. "Jimmy" Gardiner and his Liberals (who ferociously fought the Klan), enjoyed about two years of prominence. It declined and disappeared, subject to widespread political and media opposition, plus internal scandals involving the use of the organization's funds.

Post–Second World War 
In 1970, the first annual Canadian Western Agribition was held in Regina. This farm-industry trade show, with its strong emphasis on livestock, is rated as one of the five top livestock shows in North America, along with those in Houston, Denver, Louisville and Toronto.

The province celebrated the 75th anniversary of its establishment in 1980, with Princess Margaret, Countess of Snowdon, presiding over the official ceremonies. In 2005, 25 years later, her sister, Queen Elizabeth II, attended the events held to mark Saskatchewan's centennial.

Since the late 20th century, First Nations have become more politically active in seeking justice for past inequities, especially related to the taking of indigenous lands by various governments. The federal and provincial governments have negotiated on numerous land claims, and developed a program of "Treaty Land Entitlement", enabling First Nations to buy land to be taken into reserves with money from settlements of claims.
"In 1992, the federal and provincial governments signed an historic land claim agreement with Saskatchewan First Nations. Under the Agreement, the First Nations received money to buy land on the open market. As a result, about 761,000 acres have been turned into reserve land and many First Nations continue to invest their settlement dollars in urban areas", including Saskatoon. The money from such settlements has enabled First Nations to invest in businesses and other economic infrastructure.

21st century 
In June 2021, a graveyard containing the remains of 751 unidentified people was found at the former Marieval Indian residential school, part of the Canadian Indian residential school system, the most found in Canada to date.

Demographics

Ethnicity 
According to the Canada 2011 Census, the largest ethnic group in Saskatchewan is German (28.6%), followed by English (24.9%), Scottish (18.9%), Canadian (18.8%), Irish (15.5%), Ukrainian (13.5%), French (Fransaskois) (12.2%), First Nations (12.1%), Norwegian (6.9%), and Polish (5.8%).

Language 
As of the 2021 Canadian Census, the ten most spoken languages in the province included English (1,094,785 or 99.24%), French (52,065 or 4.72%), Tagalog (36,125 or 3.27%), Cree (24,850 or 2.25%), Hindi (15,745 or 1.43%), Punjabi (13,310 or 1.21%), German (11,815 or 1.07%), Mandarin (11,590 or 1.05%), Spanish (11,185 or 1.01%), and Ukrainian (10,795 or 0.98%). The question on knowledge of languages allows for multiple responses.

Religion 
According to the 2021 census, religious groups in Saskatchewan included:
Christianity (621,250 persons or 56.3%)
Irreligion (403,960 persons or 36.6%)
Islam (25,455 persons or 2.3%)
Indigenous Spirituality (16,300 persons or 1.5%)
Hinduism (14,150 persons or 1.3%)
Sikhism (9,040 persons or 0.8%)
Buddhism (4,410 persons or 0.4%)
Judaism (1,105 persons or 0.1%)
Other (7,540 persons or 0.7%)

Economy 

Historically, Saskatchewan's economy was primarily associated with agriculture, with wheat being the precious symbol on the province's flag. Increasing diversification has resulted in agriculture, forestry, fishing, and hunting only making up 8.9% of the province's GDP in 2018. Saskatchewan grows a large portion of Canada's grain. In 2017, the production of canola surpassed the production of wheat, which is Saskatchewan's most familiar crop and the one most often associated with the province. The total net income from farming was $3.3 billion in 2017, which was $0.9 billion less than the income in 2016. Other grains such as flax, rye, oats, peas, lentils, canary seed, and barley are also produced in the province. Saskatchewan is the world's largest exporter of mustard seed. Beef cattle production by a Canadian province is only exceeded by Alberta. In the northern part of the province, forestry is also a significant industry.

Mining is a major industry in the province, with Saskatchewan being the world's largest exporter of potash and uranium. Oil and natural gas production is also a very important part of Saskatchewan's economy, although the oil industry is larger. Among Canadian provinces, only Alberta exceeds Saskatchewan in overall oil production. Heavy crude is extracted in the Lloydminster-Kerrobert-Kindersley areas. Light crude is found in the Kindersley-Swift Current areas as well as the Weyburn-Estevan fields. Natural gas is found almost entirely in the western part of Saskatchewan, from the Primrose Lake area through Lloydminster, Unity, Kindersley, Leader, and around Maple Creek areas.

A list of the companies includes The Potash Corporation of Saskatchewan (defunct in December 2017), Federated Cooperatives Ltd. and IPSCO.

Major Saskatchewan-based Crown corporations are Saskatchewan Government Insurance (SGI), SaskTel, SaskEnergy (the province's main supplier of natural gas), and SaskPower. Bombardier runs the NATO Flying Training Centre at 15 Wing, near Moose Jaw. Bombardier was awarded a long-term contract in the late 1990s for $2.8 billion from the federal government for the purchase of military aircraft and the running of the training facility. SaskPower since 1929 has been the principal supplier of electricity in Saskatchewan, serving more than 451,000 customers and managing $4.5 billion in assets. SaskPower is a major employer in the province with almost 2,500 permanent full-time staff located in 71 communities.

Education 

Publicly funded elementary and secondary schools in the province are administered by twenty-seven school divisions. Public elementary and secondary schools either operate as secular or as a separate schools. Nearly all school divisions, except one operate as an English first language school board. The Division scolaire francophone No. 310 is the only school division that operates French first language schools. In addition to elementary and secondary schools, the province is also home to several post-secondary institutions.

The first education on the prairies took place within the family groups of the First Nations and early fur trading settlers. There were only a few missionary or trading post schools established in Rupert's Land – later known as the North West Territories. The first 76 North-West Territories school districts and the first Board of Education meeting formed in 1886. The pioneering boom formed ethnic bloc settlements. Communities were seeking education for their children similar to the schools of their homeland. Log cabins, and dwellings were constructed for the assembly of the community, school, church, dances and meetings.

The prosperity of the Roaring Twenties and the success of farmers in proving up on their homesteads helped provide funding to standardize education.  Textbooks, normal schools for educating teachers, formal school curricula and state of the art school house architectural plans provided continuity throughout the province. English as the school language helped to provide economic stability because one community could communicate with another and goods could be traded and sold in a common language. The number of one-room schoolhouse districts across Saskatchewan totalled approximately 5,000 at the height of this system of education in the late 1940s.

Following World War II, the transition from many one-room schoolhouses to fewer and larger consolidated modern technological town and city schools occurred as a means of ensuring technical education. School buses, highways, and family vehicles create ease and accessibility of a population shift to larger towns and cities. Combines and tractors mean the farmer could manage more than a quarter section of land, so there was a shift from family farms and subsistence crops to cash crops grown on many sections of land. School vouchers have been newly proposed as a means of allowing competition between rural schools and making the operation of co-operative schools practicable in rural areas.

Healthcare 

Saskatchewan's Ministry of Health is responsible for policy direction, sets and monitors standards, and provides funding for regional health authorities and provincial health services. Saskatchewan's health system is a single-payer system. Medical practitioners in Saskatchewan are independent contractors. They remit their accounts to the publicly funded Saskatchewan Medical Care Insurance Plan, which pays the accounts. Patients do not pay anything to their doctors or hospitals for medical care.

In 1944, the Cooperative Commonwealth Federation (CCF), a left-wing agrarian and labour party, won the provincial election in Saskatchewan and formed the first socialist government in North American history. Repeatedly re-elected, the CFC campaigned in the early 1960s on the theme of universal health coverage and, after winning the election again, implemented it, the first in Canada. However, it was fiercely opposed by the province's doctors' union, which went on a massive strike the day the new system came into effect. Supported by the Saskatchewan Chamber of Commerce, most newspapers and the right-wing Keep Our Doctors movement, the doctors' union ran an effective communications campaign portraying the universal health care system as a communist scheme that would spread disease. The strike, which had become very unpopular because of the outrageous rhetoric of some of its leaders (one of them had called for bloodshed), finally ended after a few weeks, and universal health coverage was adopted by the whole country five years later.

Government and politics 

Saskatchewan has the same form of government as the other Canadian provinces with a lieutenant-governor (who is the representative of the King in Right of Saskatchewan), premier, and a unicameral legislature.

During the 20th century, Saskatchewan was one of Canada's more left-wing provinces, reflecting the slant of its many rural citizens which distrusted the distant capital government and which favored a strong local government to attend to their issues. In 1944 Tommy Douglas became premier of the first avowedly socialist regional government in North America. Most of his Members of the Legislative Assembly (MLAs) represented rural and small-town ridings. Under his Cooperative Commonwealth Federation government, Saskatchewan became the first province to have Medicare. In 1961, Douglas left provincial politics to become the first leader of the federal New Democratic Party. In the 21st century, Saskatchewan began to drift to the right-wing, generally attributed to the province's economy shifting toward oil and gas production. In the 2015 federal election, the Conservative Party of Canada won ten of the province's fourteen seats, followed by the New Democratic Party with three and the Liberal Party of Canada with one; in the 2019 election, the Conservatives won in all of Saskatchewan's 14 seats, sweeping their competition.

Provincial politics in Saskatchewan is dominated by the social-democratic Saskatchewan New Democratic Party and the centre-right Saskatchewan Party, with the latter holding the majority in the Legislative Assembly of Saskatchewan since 2007. The current Premier of Saskatchewan is Scott Moe, who took over the leadership of the Saskatchewan Party in 2018 following the resignation of Brad Wall. Numerous smaller political parties also run candidates in provincial elections, including the Green Party of Saskatchewan, Liberal Party of Saskatchewan, and the Progressive Conservative Party of Saskatchewan, but none is currently represented in the Legislative Assembly (federal Conservatives and Liberals generally favour the Saskatchewan Party in provincial elections).

No Prime Minister of Canada has been born in Saskatchewan, but two (William Lyon Mackenzie King and John Diefenbaker) represented the province in the House of Commons of Canada during their tenures as head of government.

Administrative divisions 

Below the provincial level of government, Saskatchewan is divided into urban and rural municipalities. The Government of Saskatchewan's Ministry of Municipal Relations recognizes three general types of municipalities and seven sub-types – urban municipalities (cities, towns, villages and resort villages), rural municipalities and northern municipalities (northern towns, northern villages and northern hamlets). The vast majority of the land mass of Northern Saskatchewan is within the unorganized Northern Saskatchewan Administration District. Cities are formed under the provincial authority of The Cities Act, which was enacted in 2002. Towns, villages, resort villages and rural municipalities are formed under the authority of The Municipalities Act, enacted in 2005. The three sub-types of northern municipalities are formed under the authority of The Northern Municipalities Act, enacted in 2010.

These 774 municipalities are local government "creatures of provincial jurisdiction" with legal personality. One of the key purposes of Saskatchewan's municipalities are "to provide services, facilities and other things that, in the opinion of council, are necessary or desirable for all or a part of the municipality". Other purposes are to: "provide good government"; "develop and maintain a safe and viable community"; "foster economic, social and environmental well-being" and "provide wise stewardship of public assets."

Transportation 

Transportation in Saskatchewan includes an infrastructure system of roads, highways, freeways, airports, ferries, pipelines, trails, waterways and railway systems serving a population of approximately 1,003,299 (according to 2007 estimates) inhabitants year-round. It is funded primarily with local and federal government funds. The Saskatchewan Department of Highways and Transportation estimates 80% of traffic is carried on the 5,031-kilometre principal system of highways.

There are also municipal roads which comprise different surfaces.

The major highways in Saskatchewan are the Trans Canada expressway, Yellowhead Highway northern Trans Canada route, Louis Riel Trail, CanAm Highway, Red Coat Trail, Northern Woods and Water route, and Saskota travel route.

The first Canadian transcontinental railway was constructed by the Canadian Pacific Railway (CPR) between 1881 and 1885. After the great east–west transcontinental railway was built, north–south connector branch lines were established. The 1920s saw the largest rise in rail line track as the CPR and Canadian National Railway (CNR) fell into competition to provide rail service within ten kilometres. In the 1960s there were applications for abandonment of branch lines. Today the only two passenger rail services in the province are The Canadian and Winnipeg–Churchill train, both operated by Via Rail. The Canadian is a transcontinental service linking Toronto with Vancouver.

The main Saskatchewan waterways are the North Saskatchewan River or South Saskatchewan River routes. In total, there are 3,050 bridges maintained by the Department of Highways in Saskatchewan. There are currently twelve ferry services operating in the province, all under the jurisdiction of the Department of Highways.

The Saskatoon Airport was initially established as part of the Royal Canadian Air Force training program during World War II. It was renamed the John G. Diefenbaker Airport in 1993. Roland J. Groome Airfield is the official designation for the Regina International Airport as of 2005; the airport was established in 1930.

Airlines offering service to Saskatchewan are Air Canada, WestJet Airlines, Delta Air Lines, Transwest Air, Sunwing Airlines, Norcanair Airlines, La Ronge Aviation Services Ltd, La Loche Airways, Osprey Wings Ltd, Buffalo Narrows Airways Ltd, Île-à-la-Crosse Airways Ltd, Voyage Air, Pronto Airways, Venture Air Ltd, Pelican Narrows Air Service, Jackson Air Services Ltd, and Northern Dene Airways Ltd.

The Government of Canada agreed to contribute $20 million for two new interchanges in Saskatoon. One of them being at the Highway 219/Lorne Avenue intersection with Circle Drive, the other at the Senator Sid Buckwold Bridge (Idylwyld Freeway) and Circle Drive. This is part of the Asia-Pacific Gateway and Corridor Initiative to improve access to the CNR's intermodal freight terminal thereby increasing Asia-Pacific trade. Also, the Government of Canada will contribute $27 million to Regina to construct a CPR intermodal facility and improve infrastructure transportation to the facility from both national highway networks, Highway 1, the TransCanada Highway and Highway 11, Louis Riel Trail. This also is part of the Asia-Pacific Gateway and Corridor Initiative to improve access to the CPR terminal and increase Asia-Pacific trade.

Culture 

Saskatchewan is home to a number of museums. The Royal Saskatchewan Museum serves as the provincial museum of the province. Other museums include Diefenbaker House, Evolution of Education Museum, Museum of Antiquities, the RCMP Heritage Centre, Rotary Museum of Police and Corrections, Saskatchewan Science Centre, Saskatchewan Western Development Museum, and the T.rex Discovery Centre.

Art 

The province is home to several art galleries, including MacKenzie Art Gallery, and Remai Modern. The province is also home to several performing arts centres including the Conexus Arts Centre in Regina, and TCU Place in Saskatoon. PAVED Arts, a new media artist-run space, is also located in Saskatoon.

Music 

The province is presently home to several concert orchestras, the Regina Symphony Orchestra, the Saskatoon Symphony Orchestra, and the Saskatoon Youth Orchestra. The Regina Symphony Orchestra is at the Conexus Arts Centre, while the Saskatoon performs at TCU Place.

Literature 

A leading writer from Saskatchewan is W. O. Mitchell (1914–1998), born in Weyburn. His best-loved novel is Who Has Seen the Wind (1947), which portrays life on the Canadian Prairies and sold almost a million copies in Canada. As a broadcaster, he is known for his radio series Jake and the Kid, which aired on CBC Radio between 1950 and 1956 and was also about life on the Prairies.

Sports 

The Saskatchewan Roughriders are the province's professional Canadian football team (playing in the Canadian Football League) and are extremely popular across Saskatchewan. The team's fans are also found to congregate on game days throughout Canada, and collectively they are known as "Rider Nation". The province's other major sports franchise is the Saskatchewan Rush of the National Lacrosse League. In their first year of competition, 2016, the Rush won both their Division Title and the League Championship.

Hockey is the most popular sport in the province. More than 490 NHL players have been born in Saskatchewan, the highest per capita output of any Canadian province, U.S. state, or European country. Notable NHL figures born in Saskatchewan include Keith Allen, Gordie Howe, Bryan Trottier, Bernie Federko, Clark Gillies, Fern Flaman, Bert Olmstead, Harry Watson, Elmer Lach, Max Bentley, Sid Abel, Doug Bentley, Eddie Shore, Clint Smith, Bryan Hextall, Johnny Bower, Emile Francis, Glenn Hall, Chuck Rayner, Brad McCrimmon, Patrick Marleau, Dave Manson, Theo Fleury, Terry Harper, Wade Redden, Brian Propp, Scott Hartnell, Ryan Getzlaf, and Chris Kunitz. Saskatchewan does not have an NHL or minor professional franchise, but five teams in the junior Western Hockey League are located in the province: the Moose Jaw Warriors, Prince Albert Raiders, Regina Pats, Saskatoon Blades and Swift Current Broncos.

In 2015, Budweiser honoured Saskatchewan for their abundance of hockey players by sculpting a 12-foot-tall hockey player monument in ice for Saskatchewan's capital city of Regina. The company then filmed this frozen monument for a national television commercial, thanking the province for creating so many goal scorers throughout hockey's history. Budweiser also gifted the "hockey player" province a trophy made of white birch—Saskatchewan's provincial tree—which bears the name of every pro player in history. Sitting atop the trophy was a golden Budweiser Red Light, synched to every current Saskatchewan player in the pros. This trophy can currently be seen at Victoria Bar in Regina.

Historically, Saskatchewan has been one of the strongest curling provinces. Teams from Saskatchewan have finished in the top three places at 38 briers and top two places in women's championships. Notable curlers from Saskatchewan include Sandra Schmirler, Ernie Richardson, and Vera Pezer. In a 2019 TSN poll, experts ranked Schmirler's Saskatchewan team, which won a gold medal at the 1998 Olympics, as the greatest women's team in Canada's history.

Symbols 

The flag of Saskatchewan was officially adopted on September 22, 1969. The flag features the provincial shield in the upper quarter nearest the staff, with the floral emblem, the Prairie Lily, in the fly. The upper green (in forest green) half of the flag represents the northern Saskatchewan forest lands, while the golden lower half of the flag symbolizes the southern wheat fields and prairies. A province-wide competition was held to design the flag, and drew over 4,000 entries. The winning design was by Anthony Drake, then living in Hodgeville.

In 2005, Saskatchewan Environment held a province-wide vote to recognize Saskatchewan's centennial year, receiving more than 10,000 online and mail-in votes from the public. The walleye was the overwhelming favourite of the six native fish species nominated for the designation, receiving more than half the votes cast. Other species in the running were the lake sturgeon, lake trout, lake whitefish, northern pike and yellow perch.

Saskatchewan's other symbols include the tartan, the licence plate, and the provincial flower. Saskatchewan's official tartan was registered with the Court of Lord Lyon King of Arms in Scotland in 1961. It has seven colours: gold, brown, green, red, yellow, white and black. The provincial licence plates display the slogan "Land of Living Skies". The provincial flower of Saskatchewan is the western red lily.

Centennial celebrations 
In 2005, Saskatchewan celebrated its centennial. To honour it, the Royal Canadian Mint issued a commemorative five-dollar coin depicting Canada's wheat fields as well as a circulation 25-cent coin of a similar design. Queen Elizabeth II and Prince Philip visited Regina, Saskatoon, and Lumsden, and the Saskatchewan-reared Joni Mitchell issued an album in Saskatchewan's honour.

See also 

 Outline of Saskatchewan
 Index of Saskatchewan-related articles

Notes

References

Further reading 

 Encyclopedia of Saskatchewan
 Archer, John H. Saskatchewan: A History. Saskatoon: Western Producer Prairie Books, 1980. 422 pp.
 Bennett, John W. and Kohl, Seena B. Settling the Canadian-American West, 1890–1915 . University of Nebraska Press, 1995. 311 pp.
 Waiser, Bill. Saskatchewan: A New History (2006)
 Bocking, D. H., ed. Pages from the Past: Essays on Saskatchewan History. Saskatoon: Western Producer Prairie Books, 1979. 299 pp.
 LaPointe, Richard and Tessier, Lucille. The Francophones of Saskatchewan: A History. Regina: University of Regina, Campion Coll., 1988. 329 pp.
 Lipset, Seymour M. Agrarian Socialism: The Cooperative Commonwealth Federation in Saskatchewan: A Study in Political Sociology . University of California Press, 1950.
 Martin, Robin Shades of Right: Nativist and Fascist Politics in Canada, 1920–1940, University of Toronto Press, 1992.

External links 

Tourism Saskatchewan
Encyclopedia of Saskatchewan
 
Saskatchewan History Online

 
1905 establishments in Canada
Provinces and territories of Canada
States and territories established in 1905
Canadian Prairies